Gravenhurst is a town in the Muskoka Region of Ontario, Canada. The Town of Gravenhurst includes a large area of the District of Muskoka, known to Ontarians as "cottage country." The town centre borders on two lakes: Lake Muskoka, which is the largest lake in the region, and Gull Lake, a smaller cottage-bordered lake.

History

Gravenhurst was first known as McCabes Landing and later as Sawdust City.  Gravenhurst was named by a postal official who was reading Gravenhurst or Thoughts on Good and Evil, a treatise by William Smith.

Gravenhurst's economic prosperity stemmed from the construction of a colonization road in the 1850s. Steamboating on the Muskoka lakes began in the 1860s. The town was located strategically at the northern terminus of the Toronto, Simcoe and Muskoka Junction Railway. The town is positioned as the "Gateway to Muskoka".

Nearby Muldrew Lake was named after the lake's second cottager, Dr. William Hawthorne Muldrew.  He was the principal of the first Gravenhurst high school in 1894.  In 1901 he published a book called Sylvan Ontario, A Guide to Our Native Trees and Shrubs.  It was the first book published on this subject in Ontario, and the drawings were his own.  All the different types of trees and shrubs of Muskoka could be seen at the school, as he transplanted many of the specimens from Muldrew Lake.

In 1942 the Royal Norwegian Air Force moved their training camp (Little Norway) from Toronto to Muskoka airfield near Gravenhurst. The Norwegians remained in Gravenhurst almost to the end of World War II in 1945.

Camp 20
Between 1940 and 1946 Gravenhurst was home to a German prisoner-of-war camp known as Camp 20. The camp is also referred to as Camp Calydor and Muskoka Officer’s Club. Many describe Camp 20 as a vacation for the prisoners of war. The camp had a swimming area fenced in on Lake Muskoka where the prisoners could bathe. By the end of the first summer, Camp 20 held 489 prisoners. They were taken around Gravenhurst to work on various projects. The prisoners of war built a set of stone steps leading down to the waterfront which can still be seen at Gull Lake Park today. They also built a light house in the park.

The camp had its own gardens where the prisoners would grow their own vegetables and they were able to smoke sausages from the local animals. Some prisoners of war said that they became friends with the guards who sought to make the place as friendly as possible to avoid escapes. Many prisoners had the opportunity to work outside of the camp and lumber camps and received a small wage as well as access to the outside world. Through this access to the outside world many German prisoners of war had love affairs with the local girls.

Ulrich Steinhilper, a German fighter ace who shot down five RAF airplanes during the Battle of Britain before himself being shot down, was one of the prisoners here; he made at least five attempts to escape from various camps, his last two attempts being at Gravenhurst.

Today, all that remains of Camp 20 is concrete pillars, a fire hydrant, and the outline of a fence. There is an information kiosk at the end of Lorne Street where visitors can go to get more information on the camp.

Original townships
The Town of Gravenhurst includes these original townships from the 1800s:
 Wood Township (eastern half)
 Morrison Township
 Ryde Township
 Muskoka Township

Demographics

In 2006, Gravenhurst's population was 95.6% white, 2.0% Aboriginal and 2.4% visible minorities.

Age Structure 
0–14 years: 14.6%
15–64 years: 64.3%
65 years and over: 21.1%

Transportation
Gravenhurst also declares itself the "Gateway to the Muskoka Lakes" and has a large gate bearing this message hanging over Muskoka District Road 169, the main road leading into town from Highway 11. The gate had been removed but was rebuilt in 2009 and stands again at the south end of town. It is the home port of the RMS Segwun, the oldest vessel powered by a working steam engine in North America.

Ontario Northland Motor Coach Services provides inter-city bus service to Gravenhurst along its Toronto to North Bay routes. The nearby Muskoka Airport has scheduled flights to Billy Bishop Toronto City Airport and also serves general aviation.

The former Gravenhurst railway station was served by Ontario Northland Railway's Northlander passenger train until the train was discontinued in 2012, it is now a railway museum.

Attractions
Parts of the Queen Elizabeth II Wildlands Provincial Park and Torrance Barrens Conservation Reserve are in Gravenhurst.

The Muskoka Wharf

The Muskoka Wharf, located on Lake Muskoka, was completed in 2005. The project cost $170 million and spreads across 89 acres. Before the new development was built, the wharf used to be used for lumber and boat building industries. It was also the entry point to the lakes. Years ago, a train would arrive at the wharf three times a day with passengers coming to Muskoka looking to settle.

Today, the wharf is full of retailers and restaurants like Boston Pizza and the Blue Willow Tea Shop. The wharf hosts a number of events in the summer including Pirate Fest and the Gravenhurst farmers’ market. There are also condominiums and a Marriott hotel for those looking to spend some time in Gravenhurst.

Winter Carnival
Every year Gravenhurst has a winter carnival for the community to enjoy.  There are events for every age at the carnival including donut eating contests, sno-yoga, ball hockey, a polar dip, and arm wrestling. The town has several dances for anyone ages nineteen and older as well as fireworks on Sunday for the closing ceremony. The fireworks take place at the Muskoka Wharf.

Education
Located on the shore of Lake Muskoka since 1949 Gravenhurst had been home to the Ontario Fire College. The College was run by the Province of Ontario, under the Fire Marshall's Office, and offered training and education programs which were based on the Ontario Fire Service Standards. Courses were available to members of any Ontario municipal fire department, whether full-time or volunteer. The Ontario Fire College was closed by the Progressive Conservative government on March 31, 2021.

Public education consists of Gravenhurst High School, and three elementary schools administered by the Trillium Lakelands District School Board.

Notable residents

Dr. Norman Bethune (1890–1939), a physician who was born in Gravenhurst (his family's home there, known as Bethune Memorial House, has been preserved as a Canadian National Historic Site).
Steve Barnes (born 1970), a former professional hockey defenceman who won the BH Cup as a member of the Manchester Storm.
Graeme Murray (born 1984), a Paralympic medalist and World Champion with the Men's National Para-Ice Hockey Team.

See also

 Bethune Memorial House
 List of towns in Ontario
 List of townships in Ontario
 List of population centres in Ontario

References

External links

Start your business or move to Gravenhurst

Lower-tier municipalities in Ontario
Municipalities in the District Municipality of Muskoka
Towns in Ontario